SGInnovate is a government-owned innovation platform in Singapore to support entrepreneurship centred on the development of deep technology. It was established in 2016 to consolidate innovation activities in Singapore, and was founded on the belief that deep technology, borne out of scientific research, can tackle some of the "greatest global challenges".

SGInnovate manages a portion of the Startup SG Equity fund worth S$200 million, which it uses to co-invest in startups that specialise in research-driven technology, together with venture capitalists and corporate companies. It also works with universities, polytechnics, and ecosystem partners to develop tech talents.

History 
In 2017, SGInnovate launched its Deep Tech Nexus strategy to develop deep technology in Singapore. The organisation announced that it will invest in at least 20 startups founded in Singapore, and will host 15,000 participants over more than 150 events in 2018.

See also 

 Venture capital
 Deep tech
 Private equity
 Seed money

References 

Government-owned companies of Singapore
2016 establishments in Singapore